Stoker the Broker is a cartoon gag panel by Henry Boltinoff which was distributed to newspapers from September 7, 1959, to 1985 by Columbia Features and the Washington Star Syndicate.

Characters and stories
Working in a style somewhat similar to the cartoons of Hank Ketcham, the prolific Boltinoff drew his stockbroker Stoker as a swell-dressed, balding chap with a white mustache and a distinguished demeanor. He interacted with buyers, sellers and his wife. In one cartoon, Stoker was revealed to be a grandfather.

Designed with a narrow column width, the feature was formatted to fit on the financial pages of newspapers. Boltinoff sometimes used the same character in advertising cartoons.

Awards
In 1981, Boltinoff received the National Cartoonists Society's Newspaper Panel Cartoon Award for his work on the cartoon series.

References

External links
National Cartoonists Society: Henry Boltinoff

1959 comics debuts
1985 comics endings
American comic strips
American comics characters
Comics characters introduced in 1960
Fictional American people
Fictional businesspeople
Gag-a-day comics
Gag cartoon comics